The Figaro was an Austrian German-language satirical magazine, published weekly in Vienna between 1857 and 1919. Its orientation was liberal-humorous.

It was founded by Karl Sitter. Between 1884 and 1889 the playwright Ludwig Anzengruber was a contributing editor - which was cut short by Anzengruber's premature death. In 1876  Friedrich Schlögl, who had been working in the magazine since 1857, founded the supplement "Wiener Luft". The magazine ceased publication in 1919, during the period of crisis following the dissolution of the Habsburg monarchy.

References

External links
 Der Figaro in the Zeitschriften data bank: 
 Figaro, Der in AEIOU
 

Defunct magazines published in Austria
German-language magazines
Magazines established in 1857
Magazines disestablished in 1919
Magazines published in Vienna
Satirical magazines published in Europe
Weekly magazines published in Austria